Əmirarx (also, Amirarkh and Emirarkh) is a village and municipality in the Agdash Rayon of Azerbaijan.  It has a population of 1,113.

References 

Populated places in Agdash District